Professional Indoor Football League may refer to:

 Professional Indoor Football League (1998), an indoor American football league founded in 1998 that ceased operation after its one season
 Indoor Professional Football League (1999–2001), an indoor American football league, successor to the 1998 PIFL, active 1999–2001
 Professional Indoor Football League, an indoor American football league founded in 2012 which operated until 2015

See also
 Indoor Football League (2008), a professional indoor American football league founded in 2008
 Indoor Football League (1999–2000), a professional indoor American football league active 1999-2000